Dave Tellvik is an American curler.

Tellvik competed at the United States Men's Championship seven times, winning it once in 1975. That earned them the chance to represent the United States at the 1975 World Men's Championship. At World's in Perth, Scotland they earned the silver medal when they lost to Otto Danieli's Team Switzerland.

Teams

References

External links
 

Living people
American male curlers
American curling champions
Year of birth missing (living people)